Just a Wife is a 1920 American silent drama film directed by Howard Hickman and starring Roy Stewart, Leatrice Joy and Kathlyn Williams. It is based on the 1910 Broadway play Just a Wife by Eugene Walter.

Cast
 Roy Stewart as 	Richard Emerson
 Leatrice Joy as 	Mary Virginia Lee
 Albert Van Antwerp as 	Robert Lee
 Kathlyn Williams as	Eleanor Lathrop
 William Lion West as 	Tom Marvin

References

Bibliography
 Connelly, Robert B. The Silents: Silent Feature Films, 1910-36, Volume 40, Issue 2. December Press, 1998.
 Munden, Kenneth White. The American Film Institute Catalog of Motion Pictures Produced in the United States, Part 1. University of California Press, 1997.

External links
 

1920 films
1920 drama films
1920s English-language films
American silent feature films
Silent American drama films
American black-and-white films
Films directed by Howard Hickman
Selznick Pictures films
1920s American films